Ostrobothnian Swedish is a variety of Finland-Swedish, spoken in Finland. Outside the autonomous island province of Åland, which is officially monolingually Swedish, Ostrobothnia is the only region of mainland Finland where Swedish-speakers are the majority (51%).

Samples of dialects

Närpes-dialect recorded in 1982 by Ann-Marie Ivars (se file for transcription).

References

Further reading
 
 
 
 
 
 
 

Swedish dialects
Finland Swedish
Ostrobothnia (region)